Big Boss Man is an album released in 2005 by the Southern American country rock band The Kentucky Headhunters. It is composed of twelve cover songs. The album's singles were "Big Boss Man", "Chug-a-Lug" and "Take These Chains from My Heart", all of which failed to chart. Four Hank Williams covers are included as well: "Honky Tonk Blues", "Take These Chains from My Heart", "Hey Good Lookin'" and "You Win Again".

Track listing

Personnel
Anthony Kenney – bass guitar, background vocals
Greg Martin – lead guitar, rhythm guitar, background vocals
Doug Phelps – lead vocals (all tracks except "Honky Tonk Blues" and "Hey Good Lookin'"), rhythm guitar, tambourine
Reese Wynans – Hammond B-3 organ, piano
Fred Young – drums, percussion, background vocals
Richard Young – rhythm guitar, lead vocals on "Honky Tonk Blues" and "Hey Good Lookin'", background vocals

References 

The Kentucky Headhunters albums
Covers albums
2005 albums